The 2009 Big 12 Conference women's basketball tournament was the 13th edition of the Big 12 Conference's annual championship tournament, held at the Cox Convention Center in Oklahoma City from March 12 until March 15, 2009.  The Tournament Champion, Baylor's Lady Bears, received an automatic bid to the 2009 NCAA Women's Division I Basketball Tournament.

The single-elimination tournament had four rounds, with the top four seeds receiving byes in the first round. Seeding was based on regular season records. The Tournament has been held every year since 1997. It was run simultaneously with the 2009 Big 12 Conference men's basketball tournament.

Seeding

Schedule

Tournament bracket
 Times listed are Central Standard Time zone.

All-Tournament team
Most Outstanding Player – Jessica Morrow, Baylor

See also
2009 Big 12 Conference men's basketball tournament
2009 NCAA Women's Division I Basketball Tournament
2008–09 NCAA Division I women's basketball rankings

References

External links
 Official 2009 Big 12 Conference women's basketball tournament Bracket

-2009 Big 12 Conference women's basketball tournament
Big 12 Conference women's basketball tournament
Basketball competitions in Oklahoma City
College sports tournaments in Oklahoma
Big 12 Conference women's basketball tournament
Big 12 Conference women's basketball tournament
Women's sports in Oklahoma